Doris Kopsky Muller (1922–1997) was an American cyclist. She was the first woman to win a national title in cycling.

A 15-year-old resident of Belleville, New Jersey, she won the first national women's cycling championship, which was held in Buffalo, New York in 1937. Her father, Joseph Kopsky, had participated in the 1912 Olympic Games in Stockholm and started in the street race and trained his daughter.

Muller started in two races on the track . She won over a mile and finished second in five miles. She was riding a bike her father had built with a big "D" on the stem. From 1937 to 1939 she was the champion of New Jersey. She married a cyclist, Paul Muller, and ended her athletic career.

In 1992, Doris Kopsky Muller was inducted into the United States Bicycling Hall of Fame.

References

1922 births
1997 deaths
American female cyclists
People from Belleville, New Jersey
Sportspeople from Essex County, New Jersey
20th-century American women
20th-century American people